Donald DeP Paige, known professionally as DeP (pronounced Deep), is a 4-time Grammy nominated American singer, actor, model and author based in Los Angeles, California, and a member of the Beta Beta chapter of the Kappa Alpha Psi fraternity. He released his debut single "For Me" in 2005. Donald "DeP" Paige specializes in skills that range from in front of the camera talents and behind the scenes business, this triple threat has been making waves for years. DeP's music is influenced by artists such as Donny Hathaway, Missy Elliott, Yolanda Adams, and Tank amongst several others. DeP has shared the stage and opened up for prominent music artists including Beyonce, Kanye West, John Legend, Chance The Rapper, Alicia Keys, Yolanda Adams, Kim Burrell, Andra Day, and Ne-Yo. He has also performed at 2016 TV Land Awards, 2016 ESPY Awards and 57th Annual Grammy Awards.

Early life 
DeP was born and raised in Houston, Texas, into a musical family with extensive roots in gospel music. Many of his family members are charter members of the Southeast Inspirational Choir, which propelled the careers of gospel artists such as Yolanda Adams, Brenda Waters, Shirley Joiner, Carl Preacher, Rise Joiner-Peters, Angela Bennet and Greg Curtis Being raised in the Outreach Missionary Baptist church, he began first singing gospel music at the age of 6. DeP would experience his first acting opportunity when he landed roles in a Six Flags commercial. He attended performing arts schools starting in elementary up until high school High School for the Performing and Visual Arts in Houston as a double focus in vocal and piano with other great talents such as Robert Glasper. He also was a part of the young performers at The Ensemble Theatre with fellow members Solange Knowles, Miss Mykie and more. He also studied piano at A All About Music. After performing secular music in High School, he transferred to Westbury High School during his Second year, he knew that he wanted to become a professional performing artist. Shortly after enrolling in college at Texas College, where he joined the Beta Beta Chapter of the Kappa Alpha Psi fraternity in Spring 2001, DeP was offered a record deal with Versatile Records in Washington DC. While growing as a credited singer, songwriter and performer, his coordinating and business skills were developed working under Rep. Al Edwards, Rob Turner of Able Ten Inc, The PHD Conference and several non profit Organizations.

Early career
During his time at Texas College in Tyler TX. DeP was signed to Versatile Records in Washington D.C. where he first began releasing his own music, which resulted in his first national release, his EP entitled "For Me". After parting ways with Versatile Records, DeP joined New York City based male R&B group, Diehard in the mid-2000s. Diehard changed their name to Signature shortly after he joined. The group was signed to Blackball Records and then bought out by Elite Records who got them their debut breakout performance of their single "Get It In" on BET's popular video countdown show, 106 & Park. After a few years, DeP parted ways with the group and took a break from entertainment to flex his business goals and complete his degree in education. During this time, he started a program called Operation Clicks, a computer literacy course for senior citizens, with the Greater Houston Area Health Education Center.

Once again rejuvenated to continue his singing, acting and modeling career, DeP relocated to Los Angeles. Since then his performance career has flourished appearing in several commercials for companies including Beats by Dre and Dos Equis.

2005–2013
DeP released his first EP, For Me in 2005.

In 2008, he released his debut single titled "Something More" which was a slow groove R&B ballad, the single was co-produced by Lejuan Samuels.

In 2008 DeP released his second EP, The Truth, with MMG Record Label which included the popular hit, "Something More.

In 2010 DeP launched a full scale marketing company, Think DeP Entertainment, which specializes in artist development, vocal coaching, EPK creation, literary services, social media optimization, web presence building and more. His second EP, The Truth was also released same year on MMG.

He collaborated with Don Benjamin and released his second single "Sugar Rush" in 2012. DēP's third single was "Contract" which was also released in 2012.

In 2013, DeP was featured as a doo-wop singer, in the commercial series featuring Dos Equis. The commercial ran for two years to become DeP's first major commercial as a lead. The commercial was produced by Radical Media and directed by Steve Miller.

In 2013, he released his fourth single "Celebrate" which was produced by Davion Botts.

2014–2017
By 2015, DeP performed with Beyonce at the Grammy Awards of 2015, 'Grammy Salutes: Stevie Wonder'. DeP was hired by producer, Bill Brummel, to voice the role of Lawerence Huggins for the documentary, Selma: The Bridge To The Ballot. The documentary that tells the story of a courageous group of students and teachers who, along with other activists, fought a nonviolent battle to win voting rights for African-Americans in the South, would be DeP's first voice over role. It has since become a tool for middle school and high school classrooms across the US.

DeP also landed a placement of an original song produced by Theo Gearring, "1st Sight", in the 2015 romantic comedy, My Favorite Five.

In 2016 DeP released his first album, Think DēP Reloaded. The LP included all of his previously released singles and some new songs including the popular single, "Red Light". The single "Red Light Pt. II", was the breakout single from this project.

During this time, DeP would be seen everywhere touring and with performances at the 2016 TV Land Awards, 2016 ESPYS and 2016 White Hot Holiday. DēP has also appeared in several music videos including "Matrimony" by Wale and Usher, "Bang Bang", and "So in Love (Jill Scott & Anthony Hamilton song)". DeP also appeared in several publications including Vibe, Rolling Stone, Sheen Magazine and Baller Alert and the 17th issue of The Grynd Report. He also became the Los Angeles brand ambassador for "Upscale Men's Jewelry and Grooming Line" for Teddy Winston Brand.

2018–2019
Throughout 2018 DeP worked with several aspiring artists across the US, successfully releasing EPs and singles for some of them which featured him as a writer, co-producer, A&R and performer, including his features on Bianca Acosta's Christmas single "Ode To Mary" and Jai G's, "Edna Jean".

In 2018, DeP began to see success in acting. He landed his first lead role for a short film called This Side Up, a true story about Henry Brown's infamous escape from slavery by mailing himself to freedom and has had cameos in several TV shows including Will & Grace and The Rookie.

DeP was named one of 2019 Top 50 Black Professionals & Entrepreneurs of Texas awarded by D Mars Magazine, and recognized by the US Congress for his work in helping develop young talent and entrepreneurship.

The Tom Joyner Foundation launched a podcast in 2019, HBCUbiquity, that spotlights HBCU's and the lifestyle around them. Calling upon DeP to write and perform the podcast opening song, he delivered a song that brought the necessary energy to bring life to the opening of the podcast.

Kanye & Sunday Service
In 2019, DeP joined the viral singing group powered by Kanye West, The Samples, gaining notoriety for their performances and unique remixes at Kanye West's Sunday Service. On Easter Sunday, April 21, 2019, their performance at the 2019 Coachella Valley Music and Arts Festival was the first spiritual/religious focus act to ever appear and stream on the stage. That performance catapulted the Samples and Sunday Service into being one of the most in demand experiences of the year. DeP helped produce two shows in his hometown of Houston for the Houston Correctional Facility, which featured Kanye West and The Sunday Service Collective. Those two shows were the first shows of its kind by the group. The Houston run was completed with a performance at Joel Osteen Lakewood Church. In June 2019, Kanye West and the Sunday Service collective, along with the Samples, were featured in GQ Italia. That month's addition released two covers featuring Keanu Reeves and Kanye West. DeP is featured on page 180 of the magazine. Kanye West and The Sunday Service Choir released "Jesus is King" and "Jesus is Born" in 2019, both dominating Billboard charts to land the number 1 and 2 spots, respectively.

Beyonce & Lion King/Black Is King
An original song entitled "Spirit" performed by Beyonce featured DeP and a few others singing background. "Spirit" was nominated for a Golden Globe and 2 Grammy Awards.
DeP was tapped again, along with the other original singers and some additional voices, to sing and perform "Spirit" alongside Beyonce for the Disney film, Black Is King.

2020–Present
In 2020, DeP was asked to be a part of several performance with John Legend including the BET Awards performance and the two day performance at the first virtual Democratic National Convention. DeP has provided background vocals for Beyonce to honor the loss of Los Angeles basketball player, Kobe Bryant. He also stage managed the 50th anniversary for the Southeast Inspirational Choir. The concert featured the choir, Yolanda Adams, of which he directed her hit song with the choir "You Made The Difference", Donald Lawrence, Kim Burell, Kathy Taylor and The Walls Group. On September 4, to commemorate his 38th birthday, DeP partnered with Nathaniel Kemp of Digital Frog Photography, and released a fully authenticated limited edition photo collection, 'X-pression 38'. The collection has 38 limited edition photos from a two-year shoot that the duo collaborated on to be a part of a special 2022 project entitled Rebirth.

In 2021, during the pandemic year DeP became more present with his company Think DeP Entertainment in working with several "Next Up" artist including Teamarrr, the first artist signed to Issa Rae record label Raedio and other notable new comers such as Duckworth. It was during this time that he was able to add "creative director" to his long list of skills and credited accomplishments thanks to creative directing Teamarrr's set for the Next Up showcase, A Day in Vegas, NYC's famed The Governor's Ball and more. That down town refocused him and he returned to "fulfill his purpose work" by restarting the completion of both his book and next LP.

Fallback To Step Up
In 2022, DeP published his first book "Fallback to Step Up". This book is part memoir, part self-help where he challenges readers to vulnerably fallback in order to step up to their next level in a various range of topics and thoughts. From destructive habits like putting yourself last, taking on other peoples’ nonsense, being petty, apologizing for being yourself, and the ageless trap of needing acceptance, readers have been using the tips step up their mindfulness and actions. The book was released on Juneteenth June 19, 2022, to the pleasure of readers worldwide who had been awaiting the release after his social media post he made 5 years earlier. It's as if the world was waiting for him to jump into the literary world as headlines stated, "Award Winning Singer - Songwriter Steps into the literary world".

Edibles & Elevation
His upcoming LP, Edibles and Elevation, is slated for release in 2022. He says "I'm finally free from the boxes and restrictions I allowed church, society, and myself to put me in as far as my vocal choices, topic choices, lyrics, and presentation as a whole." The project came at a time when the entertainer was seeming to be falling out of love with music. "I was falling out love with music because I wasn't creating music that I loved, but I brought it back with Edibles and Elevation." The project came after having a 420 session where the artist says "I loved the conversations that my peers and I were having." “I loved the outlook that I had, and for the first time, I could stop the business approach to my creativity." DeP has a lot of guest producers and artist for this project stating that it is unlike any project he has ever done for himself.

Southeast Inspirational Choir
Never wanting to give the core of his values and roots, DeP still always has his hands, his hear and his talent in Gospel music. He believes that it is wild for the church to put restrictions on who can have a relationship with God and talk about it publicly. Though he says he doesn't subscribe any longer to every aspect of religion as a whole, he has an intense relationship with God and sees God as his source provider. DeP's mom, Karen, is a core member of the Southeast Inspirational Choir along with a host of family members and Gospel stars including Yolanda Adams, Rise Joiner, Producer Greg Curtis, Angela Bennet, Gene Moore Jr., Nikki Ross, and a more. The choir had a string of hits from "My Liberty" to "Inspire Me" in a career that toured and blessed the world. They had notable performances with legends such as Ray Charles, Kenny Rodgers, Dolly Pardon and more. In 2020, the choir celebrated their with a concert commemorated the career and DeP was brought in to represent the next generation as stage manager and creative director. Special guest included Donald Lawrence, Yolanda Adams, Kim Burrell, Kathy Taylor, The Walls Group and more. A spontaneous opportunity to direct one of the choir's major hits, "You Made The Difference" lead by, we got to see Donald back in his childhood element. Post pandemic, In what he calls a full circle moment and an opportunity to give back to God and his community, DeP is currently working with the Southeast Inspirational Choir as a coproducer on their final album in celebration of their 50 year pioneering career in the gospel music industry. Southeast was founded by the late gospel greats Brenda Waters, Carl Preacher and Shirley Joiner professionally known by their recording moniker BC&S respectively. The project is slated for release in 2023.

Author

"Fallback to Step Up" Published by Think DeP Entertainment (Juneteenth | June 19, 2022)

Fallback to Step Up is available in E-book and Paperback format. The audio book version will be available in 2023 with a few special musical additions.

Discography

Singles
"For Me" (2005)
"Something More" (2008)
"Contract" (2012)
"Celebrate" (2013)
"Red Light" (2016)
"Red Light Pt. II" (2016)
"Ode To Mary" Bianca Acosta Ft. DeP (2018)
"Fallback" (2019)

Albums
For Me EP (2005)The Truth (2008)Think DeP Reloaded (2016)The Gift: Lion King "SPIRIT" (2019)Jesus is King (2019)Jesus is Born (2019)Edibles and Elevation'' (2022)

Filmography

References

External links

Official website
BlogTalkRadio: Graffiti Bleu Interview 
NumberOneMusic
Last.fm

Musicians from Houston
African-American male actors
African-American male singers
American contemporary R&B singers
Kappa Alpha Psi